Jarrad Davis (born November 16, 1994) is an American football linebacker for the New York Giants of the National Football League (NFL). He played college football at Florida and was drafted by the Detroit Lions in the first round of the 2017 NFL Draft.

Early years
Davis attended Camden County High School in Kingsland, Georgia. As a senior, he had 114 tackles and three forced fumbles for the Wildcats football team. He originally committed to Auburn University to play college football but changed his commitment to the University of Florida.

College career
As a true freshman at Florida in 2013, Davis played in all 12 games with one start, recording 24 tackles. As a sophomore in 2014, he played in nine games and missed three due to a torn meniscus, finishing with 23 tackles. As a junior in 2015, he started 12 of 14 games, recording 98 tackles, 3.5 sacks, and one interception.

Professional career
On December 12, 2016, it was announced that Davis had accepted his invitation to play in the 2017 Senior Bowl. Unfortunately, Davis was unable to attend after suffering a sprained ankle during his senior season.
Davis was one of 29 collegiate linebackers who attended the NFL Scouting Combine, but was unable to perform any drills due to an ankle injury. On March 28, 2017, Davis attended Florida's Pro Day and performed all of the combine and positional drills for team representatives and scouts who attended. His 40-yard dash would've been the second fastest time among all linebackers at the NFL Combine. During the draft process, Davis attended private visits and workouts with the Detroit Lions and Pittsburgh Steelers. NFL Draft experts and analysts projected Davis to be selected in the first or second round. He was ranked the second best inside linebacker in the draft by NFLDraftScout.com, was ranked the third best inside linebacker by NFL analyst Bucky Brooks, was ranked the third best linebacker by NFL analyst Mike Mayock, and was ranked the fourth best linebacker in the draft by Sports Illustrated and ESPN.

Detroit Lions
The Detroit Lions selected Davis in the first round (21st overall) of the 2017 NFL Draft. He was the second linebacker selected, behind Haason Reddick.

2017
On May 12, 2017, the Detroit Lions signed Davis to a four-year, $10.96 million contract that includes $8.54 million guaranteed and a signing bonus of $6.11 million.

Davis entered training camp, slated as the starting middle linebacker. Head coach Jim Caldwell officially named Davis the starting middle linebacker to begin the regular season.

He started the Detroit Lions' season-opener against the Arizona Cardinals and recorded nine solo tackles and recovered the first fumble of his career by Cardinals' running back David Johnson in their 35-23 victory. The following week, he recorded six combined tackles and made the first sack of his career on New York Giants quarterback Eli Manning in the Lions' 24-10 victory. Unfortunately, he left the game in the fourth quarter after suffering a concussion when Giants wide receiver Odell Beckham Jr. blocked Davis into Giants running back Paul Perkins. He remained in concussion protocol and missed the next two games due to concussion symptoms. On December 10, 2017, Davis made nine combined tackles and sacked quarterback Jameis Winston as the Lions defeated the Tampa Bay Buccaneers 24-21. In Week 17, he recorded a season-high 12 combined tackles, a pass deflection, and made his first career interception in a 35-11 win against the Green Bay Packers. He made his interception off of a pass attempt by Brett Hundley that was intended for Jamaal Williams and returned it for 12 yards before being tackled by Lance Kendricks to end the Packers' first drive of the game. He finished his rookie season with 96 combined tackles (65 solo), three pass deflections, two sacks, an interception, a forced fumble, and a fumble recovery in 14 games and 14 starts. The Detroit Lions finished second in the NFC North with a 9-7 record but missed the playoffs, and thus the team decided to part ways with head coach Jim Caldwell at the end of the season.

2019
Davis entered the 2019 season as the Lions' starting middle linebacker. He started 11 games before being placed on injured reserve on December 14, 2019. He finished the season with 63 tackles, two sacks, and three forced fumbles.

2020
On May 2, 2020, the Lions declined the fifth-year option on Davis' contract, making him a free agent in 2021. He was placed on the reserve/COVID-19 list by the team on November 3, 2020, and activated six days later.

New York Jets
On March 18, 2021, Davis signed with the New York Jets. He was placed on injured reserve on September 1, 2021. He was activated on October 30.

Detroit Lions (second stint)
On March 25, 2022, Jarrad Davis signed a deal to return to the Detroit Lions. He was released on August 30, 2022 and signed to the practice squad the next day.

New York Giants
On December 28, 2022, Davis was signed by the New York Giants off the Detroit Lions practice squad. He re-signed with the team on March 8, 2023.

Career statistics

References

External links

Florida Gators bio
Detroit Lions bio

1994 births
Living people
People from Kingsland, Georgia
Players of American football from Georgia (U.S. state)
American football linebackers
Florida Gators football players
Detroit Lions players
New York Jets players
New York Giants players